William McAdoo  may refer to:
William McAdoo (New Jersey politician) (1853–1930), U.S. Representative from New Jersey
William Gibbs McAdoo (1863–1941), U.S. Secretary of the Treasury and U.S. Senator from California